Michael O'Meara (born 4 February 1969) is a former Irish sportsperson.  He played hurling with his local club Toomevara
and with the Tipperary senior inter-county team in the 1990s.

Career
O'Meara was a non-playing substitute as Tipperary won the 1991 All-Ireland Senior Hurling Championship with victory against Kilkenny by 1–16 to 0–15 in the final.
In 1993 he captained Tipperary to win the 1993 Munster Senior Hurling Championship after a 3–27 to 2–12 win against Clare at the Gaelic Grounds. In May 1994 he picked up a winners medal as Tiperary won the 1994 National League, defeating Galway by 2–14 to 0–12 in the final.

References

External links
GAA Info Profile
Tipperary Archive Record

Teams

Living people
Tipperary inter-county hurlers
Toomevara hurlers
1969 births